William M. "Bill" Corrigan, Jr., is an American politician and lawyer.  He served as one of the youngest presidents of the Missouri State Bar Association and he won the 2010 Republican primary election for county executive of St. Louis County, Missouri.

Early life and career 
Corrigan grew up in Florissant, Missouri and attended Chaminade College Preparatory School (Missouri).  Bill Corrigan is the son of St. Louis County Circuit Judge William Corrigan.  Bill Corrigan worked at a General Motors assembly plant in order to put himself through college at the University of Notre Dame.  After obtaining his bachelor's degree he attended law school at the University of Missouri where he obtained his Juris Doctor degree.  Since law school Corrigan has received several awards recognizing his success as a lawyer.

Bill Corrigan is currently a lawyer at Armstrong Teasdale.  In addition he serves on the board of directors of several private and public companies.  He has received a 40 under 40 award from the St. Louis Business Journal.  Corrigan is also involved in many charity organizations and he is a Sunday school teacher at the Immacolata parish.  He is a former president of the Edgewood Children’s Center Development Board and a former vice president of the Cardinal Glennon Children’s Hospital Development Board.  In addition he helped lead an effort to give free legal advice to victims of the Great Flood of 1993.

Political career 
On June 2, 2009 Bill Corrigan announced that he would be running for county executive.  As a candidate for county executive, Corrigan supported tax reform and property tax reduction.  He also supported reducing the spending of the county and making the county government more accountable and transparent.  Corrigan won the Republican primary with 88.59 percent of the vote. He obtained 17,844 more votes than Charlie Dooley, the incumbent and the winner of the Democratic primary, obtained in the Democratic primary.  After announcing his candidacy for county executive, Corrigan was immediately supported by Missouri State Senator Jane Cunningham, Missouri State Senator Jim Lembke, Missouri State Senator Eric Schmitt, former Missouri State Senator Michael R. Gibbons, and former Missouri State Senator Anita Yeckel.  Dooley narrowly defeated Corrigan on November 7, 2010, with a 51% to 47% margin of victory.

Electoral history

See also
St. Louis County, Missouri

References

Year of birth missing (living people)
Living people
Politicians from St. Louis
Missouri Republicans
University of Notre Dame alumni
University of Missouri alumni
Chaminade College Preparatory School (Missouri) alumni